The discography of The Mighty Mighty Bosstones, an American ska punk band formed in 1985 in Boston, Massachusetts, consists of eleven studio albums, ten EPs and twenty two singles, among other recordings.

The Bosstones' 1997 release Let's Face It was the most commercially successful album for the band, featuring the hit single "The Impression That I Get", which hit number one on the Modern Rock Tracks chart. Many attribute the surge of ska punk popularity in the late 90s to the single's success. That album earned a gold and platinum certification by the Recording Industry Association of America (RIAA).

Albums

Studio albums

Live albums
 Live from the Pit (1997) (radio promo only) 
 Live from the Middle East (1998) - US No. 144

Compilation albums
 Awfully Quiet (2001) (UK only collection of songs from the Taang! releases)
 Medium Rare (2007) (a mix of new and previously unreleased material as well as vinyl B-sides)

EPs
 Where'd You Go? (1991)
 Ska-Core, the Devil, and More (1993)
 Simmer Down (1994) (promotional only)
 Here We Go Again (1995); packaged with later pressings of Question the Answers
 So Far, So Good (1997) (promotional only)
 A Sample (1997) (promotional cassette only)
 Wake Up Call (1998) (promotional only)
 Selections from the Middle East (1998) (promotional only)
 Toe Tapping Treats (2000) (promotional only; also includes one Sum 41 track)
 The Mighty Mighty Bosstones / Madcap (2002) (split EP release with Madcap released by Chunksaah Records)
 Don't Worry Desmond Dekker (2008)

Singles

Music videos
 "Devil's Night Out" (1990)
 "Where'd You Go?" (1991)
 "Guns and the Young" (1992)
 "Don't Know How to Party" (1993)
 "Someday I Suppose" (1993)
 "Simmer Down" (1994)
 "Detroit Rock City" (1994)
 "Kinder Words" (1994)
 "Hell of a Hat" (1995)
 "The Impression That I Get" (1997)
 "The Rascal King" (1997)
 "The Common Decency" (1997)
 "Royal Oil" (1998)
 "Wrong Thing Right Then" (1998)
 "Zig Zag Dance" (1998)
 "So Sad to Say" (2000)
 "You Gotta Go!" (2002)
 "Don't Worry Desmond Dekker" (2008)
 "2000 Miles" (2010)
 "The Daylights" (2012)
 "A Wonderful Day for the Race" (2018)
 "The Constant" (2018)
 "The Final Parade" (2021)
 "I Don't Believe in Anything" (2021)
 "The Killing of King Georgie (Part III)" (2021)

Other appearances
Compilations
 Mashin' Up the Nation: Best of American Ska Volumes 1 & 2 (1987)
 Mash It Up: Volume 3 (1994)
 Kiss My Ass: Classic Kiss Regrooved (1994)
 Ska-Ville USA: Volume 2 (1995)
 Music for Our Mother Ocean 2 (with the Pietasters) (1997)
 A Home for the Holidays (1997)
 KROQ Kevin & Bean: A Family Christmas in Your Ass (1997)
 Tibetan Freedom Concert (1997)
 Mashin' Up the Nation: Best of American Ska Volumes 3 & 4 (1998)
 Boston Retroactive (1999)
 Burning London – The Clash Tribute (1999)
 Metalliska – A Ska Tribute to 80's Metal (2000)
 Warped Tour 2001 Tour Compilation (2001)
 A Santa Cause: It's a Punk Rock Christmas (2003)
 The Best of the Mighty Mighty Bosstones - 20th Century Masters: The Millennium Collection (2005)

Soundtracks
 Clueless (1995)
 Meet the Deedles (1997)
 Elmopalooza! (1998)
 Rogue Trip: Vacation 2012 (1998)
 Digimon: The Movie (2000)
 Step Brothers'' (2008)

References

Punk rock group discographies
Discographies of American artists